The 1979 Richmond Spiders football team represented the University of Richmond in the 1979 NCAA Division I-A football season. The Spiders were led by sixth year head coach Jim Tait and played their home games at City Stadium. They were classified as an Independent. The 1979 campaign marked Tait's final year as head coach after Richmond finished with a winless 0–11 record.

Schedule

Roster

References

Richmond
Richmond Spiders football seasons
College football winless seasons
Richmond Spiders football